Shaw Farm may refer to:
 Shaw Family Farms, Wagram, NC, listed on the NRHP in North Carolina
 Shaw Farm (Ross, Ohio), listed on the NRHP in Ohio
 Shaw Farm (Bayfield County, Wisconsin), listed on the NRHP in Wisconsin
 Shaw Farm, Windsor, part of the Crown Estate

See also
Shaw House (disambiguation)